The following lists events that happened during 1840 in Chile.

Incumbents
President: José Joaquín Prieto

Events
 July 1 - Establishment of the Roman Catholic Archdiocese of La Serena and the Roman Catholic Diocese of San Carlos de Ancud

Births
 July 19 - José Manuel Balmaceda, President of Chile (died 1891)

Deaths

References

 
1840s in Chile
Years of the 19th century in Chile
Chile
Chile